The following is a list of companies based in San Francisco, California. Fortune 500 rankings are indicated in parentheses, based on the list of the Fortune 500 companies in 2008.

Companies currently based in San Francisco

Advertising
140 Proof
AKQA
Goodby, Silverstein & Partners
Landor Associates
Mullen
Traction

Automotive
Cruise Automation
Otto (company)

Banks
Bank of the Orient
Bank of the West (BancWest)
Chime
First Republic Bank
UnionBanCal Corporation
Wells Fargo

Beverages (alcoholic)
Anchor Brewing Company
SKYY Spirits
Speakeasy Ales and Lagers

Beverages (non-alcoholic)
Adina World Beat Beverages
Hint Water

Broadcasting and cable TV
Northern California Public Broadcasting
Pac-12 Network

Business services
Ammunition Design Group
Coursmos
Duane Morris
Elanex
Gensler
Morrison & Foerster
Orrick, Herrington & Sutcliffe
Sparkpr

Communications equipment
Boombotix
Riverbed Technology

Computer services
AfterCollege
AllBusiness.com
Automattic
Bebo
Bleacher Report
Chegg
Clinkle
Cloudflare
Cotap
Craigslist
CrowdFlower
Digg
Disqus
Dropbox
Dropcam, Inc.
DocuSign
Eventbrite, Inc.
Fitbit
Flexport
Grammarly
Hack Reactor
Hired
HubPages
IGN Entertainment
imgur
Indiegogo
Instacart
Internet Archive
Jawbone
Joyent
Jones IT
Kink.com
Kongregate
LiveJournal
Lucidworks
Lyft
Meraki
Meta Platforms
Mevio
Mimecast
Nextdoor
ON24
OpenDNS
Pinterest
Pogo.com
Postman, Inc.
Postmates
Practice Fusion
Prezi
Quantcast
Reddit
Revision3
Salesforce.com
SAY Media
Sidecar
Slack
Snip.it
Splunk
StumbleUpon
Survata
Talenthouse
Technorati
Trulia
Twitch
Twitter
Uber
Ustream
ViacomCBS Streaming
Whiskey Media
Wikia
Wolfgang's Vault
Yammer
Yelp
YouNoodle
Zedo

Construction
Gensler
Swinerton
T. Y. Lin International
URS

Consumer financial services
Block
Chime
Earnest
LendUp
SoFi
Stripe

Food
Big Heart Pet Brands
Boudin Bakery
Del Monte
DoorDash
Double Rainbow (ice cream)
Diamond Foods
Driscoll's
Eatsa
Guittard Chocolate Company
Jack & Jason's Pancakes & Waffles
La Boulange
OLLY
TCHO
Traveling Spoon

Hospitals
California Pacific Medical Center
Dignity Health
Saint Francis Memorial Hospital
St. Mary's Medical Center
University of California, San Francisco
UCSF Medical Center
UCSF Benioff Children's Hospital

Hospitality
Airbnb
Joie de Vivre Hospitality
Kimpton Hotels & Restaurants

Insurance (accident and health)
Blue Shield of California
State Compensation Insurance Fund

Insurance (property and casualty)
Esurance
Metromile
Vouch

Investment services
BV Capital
Charles Schwab
Liquid Realty Partners
Golden Gate Capital
Savant Investment Group
ThinkEquity LLC
Thomas Weisel Partners
Wells Fargo
WR Hambrecht + Co

Motion pictures
Dolby Laboratories
Industrial Light & Magic
LucasArts
Lucasfilm

Personal and household products
JUUL
Method Products

Public benefit
Electronic Frontier Foundation
Kiva
The Sierra Club
Skoll Foundation
TechSoup.org
Wikimedia Foundation

Publishing and printing
Afar
Blurb
 Capra Press
Chronicle Books
Dwell
McSweeney's
Mother Jones
PC World
VIZ Media
Wired
XLR8R

Real estate
Digital Realty
Jay Paul Company
LiquidSpace
LoopNet
Pier 39
Prologis

Recreational activities
Club One
Hornblower Cruises
Golden State Warriors
San Francisco 49ers
San Francisco Giants
SHN

Resource recovery
Recology

Resource sharing
Getaround
RelayRides
Turo

Retail (apparel & shoes)
Allbirds
Amour Vert
Banana Republic
BeGood Clothing
Birdies
 Cuyana
 Everlane
Stitch Fix
Gap Inc.
Jessica McClintock
Le Tote
Levi Strauss & Co.
ModCloth
Modern Citizen
Old Navy
Rothy’s
Tea Collection
Thrasher
North Face
ThirdLove
Athleta
The RealReal

Retail (non-physical)
Americana Exchange
True & Co.

Retail (specialty)
Betabrand
Brandless
Cameron Hughes Wine
Good Vibrations
Gump's
McRoskey Mattress Company
One Kings Lane
Pottery Barn
Timbuk2
Touch of Modern
Williams-Sonoma, Inc.
RH
Minted
Roost
Chairish

Software and programming
Ubisoft
Advent Software
AppDynamics
BitTorrent, Inc.
Calypso Technology
Clarizen
Clustrix
Discord
Kx Systems
JotForm
Linden Lab
MathCrunch
MyTime
New Relic
OpenTable
Optimizely
Piggybackr
Square
Twitter
VerticalResponse
WhatsApp
Zynga

Utilities
Pacific Bell
Pacific Gas & Electric
Recology

Companies formerly based in San Francisco
Bank of America – relocated to Charlotte, North Carolina
California State Automobile Association – relocated to Walnut Creek, California
Chevron – relocated to San Ramon, California
Cost Plus World Market - relocated to Oakland
Crocker Bank – purchased by Wells Fargo Bank
Esprit – relocated to Ratingen, Germany and Hong Kong, China
Excite@Home – purchased by Ask.com
Flickr – acquired by Yahoo!
Folgers Coffee – acquired by The J.M. Smucker Co.
Gymboree - defunct
Hambrecht & Quist, LLC – purchased by Chase Manhattan Bank, later folded into JP Morgan Securities following Chase's purchase of JPM
Hearst Corporation – relocated to New York City
Hills Brothers Coffee – purchased by Massimo Zanetti Beverage USA
Link TV - merged with KCET in 2012
Montgomery Securities – purchased by NationsBank Corporation on June 30, 1997
Pacific Telesis – acquired by SBC Communications, which became AT&T when it purchased AT&T Corporation
Pacific Gas and Electric Company - moved to Oakland, CA in 2022
Pegasus Aviation Finance Company – acquired by AWAS
Popchips
Robertson Stephens – closed by its parent company FleetBoston in July 2002
Rolling Stone – relocated to New York City, New York
The Sharper Image
Sega of America - relocated to Irvine, California in 2015
Six Apart – moved to Tokyo
Southern Pacific – acquired by Union Pacific Railroad
Swensen's Ice Cream – acquired by International Franchise Corp (IFC) of Markham, Ontario, Canada
Transamerica – purchased by Aegon
United Commercial Bank – acquired by East West Bank

See also
List of companies based in the San Francisco Bay Area

References

 
San Francisco
Companies